= Nikolai Eberhardt =

German physicist and author (1930–2014)

Nikolai Eberhardt (2 July 1930 – 24 July 2014) was a German physicist and author of From the Big Bang to the Human Predicament (1998).

== Life and career ==
Born on 2 July 1930 in Estonia, Eberhardt had German, Swedish and Russian ancestry. He studied philosophy in Graz, Austria and physics in Munich, gaining a physics diploma in 1957, and a Doctor of Science degree (Dr. rer. nat.) in 1962 from the Institute of Technology in Munich. He served as Professor of Electrical Engineering at Lehigh University (Emeritus from 1995). Intermittently he also served as adjunct professor in the Science, Technology and Society program. Besides numerous publications, he has multiple patents to his credit in the areas of color-television tubes, microwave devices, robotics and instrumentation. He was Digest Editor of the 1976 IEEE International Microwave Symposium.

Eberhardt died in Bethlehem on 24 July 2014, at the age of 84.
